DZ Comedy Show (Arabic: ديزاد كوميدي شو, Dīzād Kūmīdī Shū) is an Algerian reality television talent show directed by Abdelkader Djeriou. Originally designed for Echorouk TV, the series were acquired by EPTV and air starting March 12, 2017 on Télévision Algérienne and A3. The goal of the program is to select a comedian from an initially large group of hopefuls. It is described as the "biggest comedy talent show of Algeria".

Format 

DZ Comedy Show is widely similar in its format to NBC's Last Comic Standing. Télévision Algérienne talent scouts Mohamed Khassani, Nassim Hadouche, Kamel Abdet and Abdelkader Jeriou hold open casting calls in seven wilayas around Algeria: Algiers, Constantine, Annaba, Oran, Sétif, Béjaïa and Ouargla. They select then, from a group of 400 candidats, only 24 comics aged between 16 and 60 years from the callbacks, who will be invited to participate in a semifinal qualifying round in Algiers, where they will perform and compete against each other. During this round, the 14 finalists will be selected and would move forward to the final or live performances round. In this round, the comics would participate in some type of comedic challenge each television week. Challenges could include performing stand-up, participating in a roast or performing comedy on a specific subject. One comic will be eliminated each week from the competition, until there will be only the "Algeria's Comedy Star of the Year".

Casting dates 
These were the casting dates for the first season of DZ Comedy Show:

See also 
 Télévision Algérienne
 A3
 Public Establishment of Television
 Television in Algeria

References

External links 
 

2017 Algerian television series debuts
Arabic-language television shows
Algerian stand-up comedy television series
2010s Algerian television series
Public Establishment of Television original programming